Oak Hill Cemetery Chapel may refer to:

 Oak Hill Cemetery Chapel (Washington, D.C.), listed on the NRHP in Washington, D.C.
 Oak Hill Cemetery Chapel (Bellows Falls, Vermont), listed on the NRHP in Windham County

See also
Oak Hill Cemetery (disambiguation)